"I'll Always Have You There" was a hit for singer and session musician Doug Gibbs. Released on the Oak label in 1972, it reached No. 25 on the Billboard soul chart.

Background
The 1972 single backed with "Cloudy Day" was released on Oak OR-108. Both sides were co-written by himself and Bruce Fisher. It was produced by Ernie Freeman. Later in 1972, the record was attracting attention, and it was reported in the September 2 issue of Billboard Magazine, that the  single was getting heavy airplay in Chicago and San Francisco.

Chart performance

Billboard
The record entered the soul singles chart at No. 37 for the week ending September 9, 1972. It peaked on the chart at No. 25 on October 7, 1972.

Cashbox
The song entered the Cashbox R&B Top 60 at No. 45 on September 23, 1972. On October 14, it peaked at No. 32.

References

1972 songs
1972 singles
Songs written by Bruce Fisher